On 24 August 2015, armed protestors affiliated with the Tharuhat Struggle Committee conducted an attack on security forces in Tikapur, a western city of Nepal. Protestors attacked officers attempting to enforce restrictions with axes, scythes, and spears killing eight, including seven police officers and a two-year-old baby. Police officer Ram Bihari Tharu was burned alive by the protestors.

Background
Minority ethnic groups have been demonstrating across Nepal, saying the new constitution, which would divide the country into seven federal states, would discriminate against them and give them insufficient autonomy.

Convictions
On March 7, 2019, Kailali District Court sentenced 11 people including a member of parliament from Rastriya Janata Party Nepal, Resham Lal Chaudhary to life in prison for their roles in orchestrating and carrying out the massacre. The families of the victims expressed relief, whereas Rastriya Janata Party-Nepal objected on the grounds that the incident was political in nature, not criminal. Legislator Chaudhary is set to be stripped of his position following the sentencing. He has already begun serving his sentence.
12 others were sentenced to 10 years in prison and one accused was sentenced to six months. One of the convicts facing life sentence is due to only serve 10 years since he was a minor at the time of the incident. Three of the tried have been acquitted. More than 30 suspects are still at large.

References

2015 in Nepal
2015 protests
Massacres in 2015
August 2015 crimes in Asia
Massacres in Nepal
Protests in Nepal
Protest-related deaths
Crimes committed against law enforcement
Kailali District